The men's K-1 200 metres canoeing event at the 2015 Pan American Games will be held between the 12 and 14 of July at the Welland Pan Am Flatwater Centre in Welland.

Schedule
The following is the competition schedule for the event:

All times are Eastern Daylight Time (UTC−4)

Results

Heats
Qualification Rules: 1..3->Final, 4..7 and 8th best time->Semifinals, Rest Out

Heat 1

Heat 2

Semifinal
Qualification Rules: 1..3->Final, Rest Out

Final

References

Canoeing at the 2015 Pan American Games